Sportzentrum Kapfenberg is an indoor sporting arena located in Kapfenberg, Austria.  The capacity of the arena is 4,600 people.  It is used mostly for ice hockey.

Indoor ice hockey venues in Austria
Sports venues in Styria